Mackesy is a surname. Notable people with the surname include:

Charles Ernest Randolph Mackesy (1861–1925), New Zealand farmer and military leader
Charlie Mackesy (born 1962), British artist
Piers Mackesy (born 1924), British military historian
Pierse Joseph Mackesy (1883–1956), British Army officer
Serena Mackesy (born c. 1960s), English journalist and novelist